Lieutenant-General Moe Myint Tun (born 24 May 1968; also spelt Moe Myint Htun) is a Burmese military officer who is currently serving as a member of Myanmar's State Administration Council. He was appointed on 2 February 2021, in the aftermath of the 2021 Myanmar coup d'état.

Early life and education 
Moe Myint Tun was born on 24 May 1968. He graduated from the Defence Services Academy in 1989 as part of the 30th intake.

Career 
Moe Myint Tun formerly served as army chief of staff and commander of the special operations bureau which oversee operations from the capital, Naypyidaw. From 2015 to 2017, he served as the commander of the Naypyidaw Command, which encompasses Naypyidaw Union Territory.

Sanctions 
The U.S. Department of the Treasury has imposed sanctions on "Moe Myint Tun" since 22 February 2021, pursuant to Executive Order 14014, for he is an official of the military or security forces of Burma and a member of the State Administration Council responsible for killing of peaceful protestors. The US sanctions include freezing of assets under the US and ban on transactions with US person.

The Government of Canada has imposed sanctions on him since 18 February 2021, pursuant to Special Economic Measures Act and Special Economic Measures (Burma) Regulations, in response to the gravity of the human rights and humanitarian situation in Myanmar (formerly Burma). Canadian sanctions include freezing of assets under Canada and ban on transactions with Canadian person.

HM Treasury and the Foreign, Commonwealth and Development Office of the United Kingdom have imposed sanctions on him since 25 February 2021, for his responsibility for serious human rights violations in Burma. The UK sanctions include freezing of assets under the UK and ban on Traveling or transiting to the UK. 

Furthermore, the Council of the European Union has imposed sanctions on him since 22 March 2021, pursuant to Council Regulation (EU) 2021/479 and Council Implementing Regulation (EU) 2021/480 which amended Council Regulation (EU) No 401/2013, for his responsibility for the military coup and the subsequent military and police repression against peaceful demonstrators. The EU sanctions include freezing of assets under member countries of the EU and ban on traveling or transiting to the countries.

Personal life
Moe Myint Tun is married to Khaing Pa Pa Chit (b. 1971), and has three daughters, Yadanar Moe Myint (b. 1994), Moe Htet Htet Tun (b. 1997), and Khaing Moe Myint (b. 2001). His children serve as directors for Yadanar Moe Htet Aung, Phyo Pyae Pyae, and Pin Gangaw companies, all of which won significant government tenders in the aftermath of the 2021 military coup.

See also 
 State Administration Council
 Tatmadaw

References 

Living people
Burmese generals
1968 births
Members of the State Administration Council
Specially Designated Nationals and Blocked Persons List
Defence Services Academy alumni
Individuals related to Myanmar sanctions